Fucking Trans Women, sometimes abbreviated as FTW, is a zine created by Mira Bellwether. A single 80-page issue "#0" was published in October 2010 and republished in 2013 as Fucking Trans Women: A Zine About the Sex Lives of Trans Women; further issues were planned, but none had been published . Bellwether wrote all of the articles in the issue, which explores a variety of sexual activities involving trans women, primarily ones who are pre-op or non-op with respect to bottom surgery. Fucking Trans Women is thought to have been the first publication of note to focus on sex with trans women and was innovative in its focus on trans women's own perspectives and its inclusion of instructions for many of the sex acts depicted. Emphasizing sex acts possible with flaccid penises or not involving penises at all, it coined the term "muffing" to refer to stimulation of the inguinal canals and popularized that act. The zine has received both popular-culture and scholarly attention, being described in Sexuality & Culture as "a comprehensive guide to trans women's sexuality" and in Playboy as "widely considered ... the ... most in-depth guide to having sex with pre- and non-op trans femme bodies".

Background 
Miranda Darling Bellwether (1982December 25, 2022), a self-described "trans dyke" then living in the U.S. state of Iowa, created the zine over the course of "a year or so". She intended to publish a zine featuring submissions from others, but found the material insufficient; she instead chose to make the zine a solo effort and number it "#0" to leave room for a "#1" featuring others' contributions. In an interview with Kennedy Nadler of Autostraddle in 2013, she wrote that she "wanted to speak to aspects of our sexuality that are almost never given any attention in media whatsoever: those of us who enjoy sex with other women, trans and otherwise, and some of the difficulties (as well as unique pleasures) of trans women having sex with cis women".

Fucking Trans Women #0 was published online in October 2010, billed as an "80-Page Giant". Bellwether republished it in print through CreateSpace in August 2013, without the "#0" and with the subtitle A Zine About the Sex Lives of Trans Women.

Design 
The zine's cover depicts a woman in a leotard (with prominent crotch bulge) and open jacket holding a whip. At her feet, indistinct figures run around in a ring.

Rachel Stevens and Megan Purdy of WomenWriteAboutComics characterized the design as "intentionally messy". The zine is black and white, with articles overlaid on grayscale images of nude or erotically-posed women. For many of the acts Bellwether depicted, no scientific diagrams existed, and so she illustrated them herself, an innovative approach for the time.

Content 

Rather than set a cohesive narrative, Bellwether focused on trans women's physical experiences. She highlighted both how trans women's bodies differ from cis men's and how they are similar to cis women's bodies, such as the structures of the penis and clitoris respectively. Bellwether had a penis and therefore focused on the perspective of pre-op and non-op trans women (those who have not had bottom surgery). She emphasized sex acts possible with flaccid ('soft') penises, associating feminizing hormone therapy–induced erectile dysfunction with pleasure rather than with a lack of sexual satisfaction. She criticized the focus of "almost all sexual discourse on penises" being "on erect penises, hard penises, penetrating penises". She also explained how trans women with penises can use strap-on dildos, which may be more pleasurable and allows trans women to decide the meaning of their body parts.

Another major focus is the innervation of trans women's bodies. Bellwether described the "thick web" of nerves spanning trans women's genital areas and showed ways to use them to bring pleasure such as stimulating the perineum. She wrote that it was important that trans women's lovers be enthusiastic about touching their bodies, rather than avoid contact out of a fear of causing offense.

Bellwether coined the term muffing to refer to the act of invaginating the scrotum and penetrating the inguinal canals, an act that Fucking Trans Women #0 is credited with popularizing. Versions include pushing the testes in and out of the inguinal canals, which Bellwether terms 'autopenetration'; pushing the testes in and then massaging the teste and the mouth of the canal; and fingering the canals without use of the testes. This masturbation technique stimulates the ilioinguinal and genitofemoral nerves. Many trans women are familiar with inserting the testes into the inguinal canals in the context of tucking, which is how Bellwether discovered the practice.

Bellwether emphasized trans women's need to learn how their own bodies work, describing a "sexy mad science (white lab coats and leather gloves optional)" of working from data toward conclusions and addressing her readers as her "fellow genital cartographers". She rejected attempts to impute a deeper meaning to trans people's genitals, writing, "what I have between my legs is not a metaphor or an analogy but something new and wonderful" and "My body is a woman's body and part of it is my penis, a woman's penis." In the context of muffing, she referred to her inguinal canals as cunts, which Lucie Fielding in Trans Sex notes in the context of a broader phenomenon of trans people renaming their body parts. Bellwether referred to "the sensitive, fleshy tube of flesh with all the nerves and blood vessels in it" as the penis for the sake of comprehension, without claiming that it is an objectively correct term.

Bellwether did not claim to speak for all trans women, but rather portrayed a diversity of experiences and sought reader submissions to fill in missing pieces. She acknowledged that the acts described in the zine may not be consistent with the experiences and desires of all trans women, telling Nadler, "It isn't everybody's story, but it's my story." Fucking Trans Women #0 ends with a submission call for a next issue including anal sex, sex among trans partners, and BDSM.

Reception and impact 
Fucking Trans Women has been highlighted by Greta R. Bauer and Rebecca Hammond in the Canadian Journal of Human Sexuality as a resource for trans sexual health and was described by Shoshanna Rosenberg et al. in Sexuality & Culture as "a comprehensive guide to trans women's sexuality". Muffing in particular has drawn attention in popular-culture sources including Playboy, Broadly, Autostraddle, and The Daily Dot; it was promoted by scholar Lucie Fielding in Jessica Stoya's sex advice column with Slate. Tobi Hill-Meyer in Autostraddle writes that "Having some familiarity with the area from tucking has led some trans women and trans fems to explore this area, and for trans women and trans fems who experience genital dysphoria, being penetrated in the front can be really meaningful." Katelyn Burns in Playboy, also emphasizing muffing as less prone to inducing dysphoria, said that Fucking Trans Women is "widely considered to be the first and most in-depth guide to having sex with pre- and non-op trans femme bodies"; Carla Pfeffer in the Journal of Homosexuality and Constance Augusta Zaber in Book Riot similarly characterize it as the first in that regard.

Fielding's Trans Sex describes a "mystification" process of seeing past the "habitual reality" of one's body and identifies as "foundational" to this Bellwether's statement in Fucking Trans Women that "The form of someone's body doesn't necessarily determine what that body means, how it works, or what it can do"; she cites this phrase further to refute the proposition that all post-op trans women will wish to engage in vaginal penetration. Ana Valens in The Daily Dot praises in particular Fucking Trans Women criticism of phallocentrism; writing sex guides there and in Allure, she cites Bellwether in discussing the innervation of trans women's genital areas as distinct from focusing solely on the penis. In The Mary Sue in 2022, Valens referred to Fucking Trans Women as "the gold standard in transfeminine sex and masturbation" and wrote that, 12 years after it was first published, it remained "one of the best resources for transfeminine people who have penises".

Rachel Stevens of WomenWriteAboutComics praised Bellwether's message to trans women that they don't have to emulate transgender pornography; her colleague Morgan Purdy agreed and pointed to her "[t]otal rejection of codifying a single trans women's sexuality". Broadly Diana Tourjée describes Fucking Trans Women as "groundbreaking" and "iconic". Using Bellwether's preferred term for her inguinal canals, she writes that the zine "helped a generation of pre or non-op trans girls reclaim their "cunts" and find new sexual practices that supported their gendered bodies." Autostraddle Nadler said it was the zine that had most influenced her life and wrote,
The zine's focus on the bodies of pre- and non-op trans women, and how these bodies move in bed, was revelatory. Reading FTW provided perhaps my first glimpse into an understanding of trans women's bodies, like mine, not as incomplete projects or disturbing visions, but as always already carrying the capacity to be beautiful, the potential to be sexual and sexy.
Nadler also notes the duality of the zine's title, which can be read either in the sense of "how to fuck trans women" or "trans women who fuck".

Bellwether died on December 25, 2022, after a stroke while in treatment for lung cancer. Ro White of Autostraddle, obituarizing Bellwether, said that "Writing about trans bodies in a way that centers playfulness—or really, writing about trans bodies at all—was revolutionary in 2010, and it's still revolutionary today." Valens, crediting her career to Bellwether, wrote by tweet that Fucking Trans Women had "changed the landscape of trans and queer sexuality" and "saved countless trans people and opened their eyes to what their bodies can do and be".

Notes

References

Citations

Sources 
Book and journal sources

Popular-culture sources

 
 
 
 
 
 
 
 
 
 
 
 
 
 
 
 

By Bellwether

External links 
 

Transgender sexuality
Transgender non-fiction books
American non-fiction books
2010 non-fiction books
2013 non-fiction books
Zines
2010s LGBT literature